The 2019–20 Basketball Champions League is the fourth season of the Basketball Champions League (BCL), a European-wide professional basketball competition for clubs, that was launched by FIBA. The competition began in September 2019, with the qualifying rounds, and was supposed to conclude in May 2020. It featured 16 domestic champion teams. On 12 March 2020, the competition was suspended because of the COVID-19 pandemic.

San Pablo Burgos won its first Champions League title after defeating AEK.

Format changes
For this season, eight teams will come from two qualifying rounds. The round of 16 and quarter-finals changed to best-of-three playoff series instead of two legs. From this season no teams were sent from the regular season to the FIBA Europe Cup, which was the case in each previous BCL season.

Changes due to the 2020 coronavirus pandemics
On 12 March 2020, FIBA suspended all its competitions, including the BCL, due to the COVID-19 pandemic. On 31 March, the BCL decided the season will have to be finished with a "Final Eight" tournament planned for 30 September until 4 October. The tournament is to be held in a single venue and will be a single-elimination tournament. Two games which were still not played in the Round of 16 will be played beforehand.

Eligibility of players
In 2017, FIBA agreed to adopt eligibility rules, forcing the clubs to have at least 5 home-grown players in rosters of 11 or 12 players, or at least four, if the team has got fewer players.

Team allocation
A total of 48 teams from 29 countries will participate in the 2019–20 Basketball Champions League. On June 24, 2019, Benfica entered in the first qualifying round and Mornar were upgraded to the second qualifying round after the Openjobmetis Varese's withdrawal.

Teams
League positions after eventual playoffs of the previous season shown in parentheses (FEC: FIBA Europe Cup title holders. WC: Wild card).

Round and draw dates
The schedule of the competition is as follows.

Qualifying rounds

Draw
The 16 teams that entered in the first round were divided into two pots. Seeded teams would play the second leg at home.

First qualifying round
A total of 16 teams will play in the first qualifying round. The first legs will be played on 17 September, while the second legs on 20 September 2019.

|}

Second qualifying round
A total of 16 teams will play in the second qualifying round: eight teams which enter in this round, and the eight winners of the first qualifying round.  The first legs will be played on 26 September, while the second legs on 29 September 2019.

|}

Regular season
The 32 teams are drawn into four groups of eight, with the restriction that teams from the same country cannot be drawn against each other. In each group, teams play against each other home-and-away, in a round-robin format. The group winners, runners-up, third-placed teams and fourth-placed teams, advance to the round of 16, while the remaining four teams in each group of the Regular Season will be eliminated.

A total of 32 teams play in the regular season: 24 teams which enter in this stage, and the eight winners of the second qualifying round. The regular season will start on 8 October 2019 and end on 5 February 2020.

Draw
Teams were divided into two pots according to the club ranking published by the organization. Twelve teams were named seeded teams while the rest would be unseeded teams. The seeded teams will be split, allocating three per group.

Firstly, the eight teams from qualifying round will be split in the four groups, with a maximum of two teams per group.

Group A

Group B

Group C

Group D

Playoffs

The playoffs started on 3 March 2020.

In the playoffs, teams play against each other over two legs on a best-of-three basis, except for the Final Four. In the playoffs draw, the group winners and the runners-up are seeded, and the third-placed teams and the fourth-placed teams are unseeded. The seeded teams are drawn against the unseeded teams, with the seeded teams hosting the second leg. Teams from the same group cannot be drawn against each other.

Bracket

Round of 16
The first legs were played on 3–4 March, the second legs on 10–11 March. Third legs will be played on 16 September 2020.

Final Eight

The concluding Final Eight tournament will be played in Athens, Greece, between 30 September and 4 October 2020.

Quarterfinals
The quarterfinals were played on 30 September and 1 October 2020.

|}

Semifinals
The semifinals were played on 2 October 2020.

|}

Third place game
The third place game was played on 4 October 2020.

|}

Final

The final was played on 4 October 2020.

|}

Awards

Season awards
The annual season awards were announced on 28 and 29 September.

Star Lineup

Game Day MVP

After each gameday a selection of five players with the highest efficiency ratings is made by the Basketball Champions League. Afterwards, the official website decides which player is crowned Game Day MVP.

Regular season

See also
2019–20 EuroLeague
2019–20 EuroCup Basketball
2019–20 FIBA Europe Cup

References

External links
Basketball Champions League (official website)
FIBA (official website)

 
Basketball Champions League
 
Basketball Champions League